Remi Johansen  (born 4 September 1990) is a Norwegian footballer who plays for Valhall FK in the 4. divisjon. He made his debut in the Norwegian Premier League 23 March 2009 for Tromsø against Rosenborg.

Career

Sandnes Ulf
Johansen left Sandnes Ulf at the end of 2018.

Career statistics

References

External links
 
 Remi Johansen at NFF

1990 births
Living people
Sportspeople from Tromsø
Association football midfielders
Norwegian footballers
Norway under-21 international footballers
Norway youth international footballers
Tromsø IL players
SK Brann players
Sandnes Ulf players
Sola FK players
Norwegian First Division players
Eliteserien players
Norwegian Second Division players